In Greek mythology, Nomia  (Νομία) was a nymph of Arcadia, where the local people believed the Nomian Mountains to have been named after her.

Mythology 
Nomia was apparently a companion of Callisto, the daughter of Lycaon: Pausanias mentions a painting of the two, with Callisto sitting on a bearskin and her feet lying on Nomia's knees; there is also Pero portrayed next to them.
Nomia is also a name for a type of water goddess, many believe that she started off as nothing but a nymph until one day Callisto, decided to trade her love for a god status.

Nomia is also a possible name for the Sicilian nymph who loved Daphnis but was abandoned by him and, in revenge, blinded the young man and changed him into a rock.

Notes

Oreads

References 

 Pausanias, Description of Greece with an English Translation by W.H.S. Jones, Litt.D., and H.A. Ormerod, M.A., in 4 Volumes. Cambridge, MA, Harvard University Press; London, William Heinemann Ltd. 1918. . Online version at the Perseus Digital Library
 Pausanias, Graeciae Descriptio. 3 vols. Leipzig, Teubner. 1903.  Greek text available at the Perseus Digital Library.

Nymphs
Arcadian characters in Greek mythology